Robert Prynne Nelson (7 August 1912 in Fulham, London – 29 October 1940 in Deal, Kent) was an English cricketer active from 1931 to 1939 who played for Middlesex and Northamptonshire (Northants). He was Northants club captain in the 1938 to 1939 seasons. He appeared in 77 first-class matches as a left-handed batsman who bowled left-arm orthodox spin. He scored 3,394 runs with a highest score of 123 not out, one of two centuries, and took 62 wickets with a best performance of three for 7.

During the Second World War, Nelson was a Second Lieutenant in the Royal Marines. He died in action at the age of 28 and his gravestone in the military section of Deal Cemetery records that he was "a lover of cricket (and) he maintained in his life the spirit of the game".

Notes
cwgc entry

1912 births
1940 deaths
English cricketers
Middlesex cricketers
Northamptonshire cricketers
Northamptonshire cricket captains
Cambridge University cricketers
Marylebone Cricket Club cricketers
Hertfordshire cricketers
Royal Marines personnel of World War II
Royal Marines personnel killed in World War II
Royal Marines officers
People from Fulham
Burials in Kent
Military personnel from London